Carystus (Ancient Greek: Κάρυστος) or Carycus, in Greek mythology, was the son of Chiron and a nymph Chariclo, brother of Hippe, Endeïs and Ocyrhoe. Carystus was the father of Zarex, and also a certain Aristaeus. The town of Carystus on Euboea took the name from him.

Notes

Characters in Greek mythology